The 2021–22 Israeli Noar Premier League is the thirty season since its introduction in 1999 and the 82nd season of top-tier football in Israel for under-19. The season began in 21 August 2021. the previous season which was extended for the summer due coronavirus pandemic and then was stopped due 2021 Israel–Palestine crisis was suspended after be completed 75% of the games. Maccabi Haifa were awarded the championship.

Format

All the 18 teams in the league will compete in against each other home-and-away in a round-robin format. The last four teams were relegated to the second division .

League table

References

External links
 Noar Premier League IFA 

Israeli Noar Premier League seasons
Youth